Association of Danish Media (Danish: Danske Medier) is a membership organization representing more than 250 media companies with a total of 1,000 media outlets, working with national and international lobby, consulting members and organising events for members and the media industry. The organization is based in Copenhagen.

History
 
The organization was founded in 2012/2013 through the merger of all major Danish associations for professional Danish media: Dansk Magasinpresses Udgiverforening (DMU), Danske Dagblades Forening (DDF), Danske Specialmedier (DS), Digitale Publicister (DP), Foreningen af Danske Interaktive Medier (FDIM), Radioerne and Ugeaviserne.

Board
The board as of 2022:

 Christina Blaagaard, Teknologiens Mediehus (formand)
 Jesper Rosener, Jysk Fynske Medier
 Stig Kirk Ørskov, JP/Politikens Hus
 Gitte Hejberg, Fagbladet FOA
 Alex Nielsen, Mediehuset Herning Folkeblad
 Stine Carsten Kendal, Information
 Ole Søndergaard, Radio ABC-gruppen
 Jesper Buchwald, Bonnier Publications
 Anders Krab-Johansen, Berlingske Media
 Christoph Nørgaard, Altinget

See also
 Danske Medier Research 
 IAB Danmark 
 Danish Film Institute

References

External links
 Official website

Mass media in Denmark
Organizations established in 2012
Organizations based in Copenhagen
2012 establishments in Denmark